Sebring International Raceway is a road course auto racing facility in the southeastern United States, located near Sebring, Florida.

Sebring Raceway is one of the oldest continuously operating race tracks in the U.S., its first race being run in 1950. Sebring is one of the classic race tracks in North American sports car racing, and plays host to the 12 Hours of Sebring.

The raceway occupies a portion of Sebring Regional Airport (an active airport for private and commercial traffic that was originally built as Hendricks Army Airfield, which was a World War II training base for the United States Army Air Forces).

History

After the war, Russian-American aeronautical engineer Alec Ulmann was seeking sites for converting military aircraft to civilian use when he discovered potential in Hendricks' runways and service roads to stage a sports car endurance race similar to the 24 Hours of Le Mans, a race Ulmann was inspired to somewhat re-create in the United States. Sebring's first race was held on New Year's Eve of 1950, attracting thirty race cars from across North America. The Sam Collier 6 Hour Memorial race was won by Frits Koster and Ralph Deshon in a Crosley Hot Shot that had been driven to the track by Victor Sharpe.

The first 12 Hours of Sebring was held on March 15, 1952, shortly growing into a major international race. In 1959, the track hosted the U.S.' first Formula One race (the successor to historic European Grand Prix motor racing), held as that year's installment of the historic United States Grand Prix competition. However poor attendance and high costs relocated the next U.S. Grand Prix to Riverside International Raceway in southern California.

For much of Sebring's history, the track followed a  layout. This was closer to the hairpin and allowed a flat-out run through a very fast corner to the top of the track and the runway. This was done to move the track off the dangerous Warehouse Straight and the warehouses, hangars and airplanes flanking it; a crash during that 1966 12 Hours involving a privately entered Porsche that went into one of the warehouses (this area was off-limits to non-track personnel) and into a crowd, killing four spectators.

The circuit was changed and shortened in 1983 to allow simultaneous use of the track and one of the runways, and major changes in 1987 allowed use of another runway. Further changes in 1991 accommodated expansion of the airport's facilities, allowing the entire track to be used without interfering with normal airport operations and bringing it close to its current configuration. The hairpin was removed in 1997 due to a lack of run-off, and replaced with what became known as the "safety pin". Gendebien Bend was also re-profiled to slow the cars' entry to the Ullman straight.

The track is currently owned by IMSA Holdings, LLC through its subsidiary Sebring International Raceway, LLC via its purchase of the Panoz MSG in September 2012. It is currently leased by the Sebring International Raceway, LLC, which acquired the facility from Andy Evans in 1997.

The track is often recognized for its famous, high-speed "Turn 17", a long, bumpy, fast right hander that can make or break a car's speed down the front straight. The corner can fit up to 3 cars wide.

Skip Barber Racing School held numerous programs at the facility, including a scholarship opportunity for young racers.

The World Endurance Championship runs a round called the 1000 Miles of Sebring, run concurrently with the famed 12 Hours. This race was first run in 2019, with Toyota Gazoo Racing winning overall.

On October 30, 2021 the 1st ever 24 Hours race at Sebring took place hosted by The World Racing League, an Amateur endurance championship series, with W2W Racing winning the overall race by 4 laps on the field in their #983 Porsche Motorsports type 981 Cayman GT4 Clubsport MR.

Track configuration

Sebring International Raceway consist of three tracks: the Full Circuit, the Short Circuit, and the Club Circuit. It is a seventeen-turn road course with long straights, several high-speed corners, and very technical slower corners. Many of the turns and points along the track are named for the early teams and drivers. Due to Florida's flat nature there is very little elevation change around the track and little camber on the surface, providing a challenging track for drivers, especially when it rains.

Sebring is renowned for its rough, bumpy and changing surfaces. The course still runs on old sections of World War II-era landing fields that were constructed of concrete sections with large seams. The transitions between sections are quite rough and often, sparks fly from the undercarriages of the cars as they traverse them. Much of the track has intentionally been left with its original concrete runway surface. The 12 Hours of Sebring is renowned as a race that is even harder on machinery and drivers than Le Mans, and is seen as an ideal preparation run for the famed French race.

Mario Andretti, a 3-time 12 Hours winner, said that one of the hardest parts about the original Sebring track was "finding the track to begin with." There had been many accounts of drivers retiring due to accidents at night, quite simply because they got lost on the runway sections and couldn't find the track again. Some drivers got lost even during the day, mostly because the track was poorly marked down with white lines and cones.

Events
Sebring is most notable for hosting the 12 Hours of Sebring, sanctioned by the FIA and IMSA, as part of many major endurance racing series, including the World Sportscar Championship, Intercontinental Le Mans Cup, ALMS, and now, the WeatherTech SportsCar Championship.  This race is the second of four races in the Michelin Endurance Cup. It has also hosted the final round of the Creventic 24H Series since 2021.

The track also hosts the Legends of Motorsport and Historic Sportscar Racing series, and is the winter home of the Skip Barber Racing School.  Many IndyCar, sports prototype, and Grand Touring teams use Sebring for winter testing due to the warm climate.

The track is used numerous times each year by the Sports Car Club of American (SCCA) and the National Auto Sport Association (NASA) for amateur events that draw participants from all over the country.

Each February, the racetrack hosts the Bike Sebring 12/24 Hours, an ultra-distance cycling race organized by the Highlands Pedalers Bicycle Club and the Rotary Club of Highlands County.

IndyCar regularly holds tests at the top half of the facility to simulate street circuits on its calendar.

Lap records

As of March 2023, the fastest official race lap records at the Sebring International Raceway for different classes are listed as:

Sebring in pop culture
Sebring Raceway is featured in the video games rFactor 2,Pitstop II, iRacing, The Crew, Forza Motorsport 2, Forza Motorsport 3, Forza Motorsport 4, Forza Motorsport 5, Forza Motorsport 6, Forza Motorsport 7, Total Immersion Racing and Sports Car GT. There are also end-user created versions for rFactor, GTR2, GTR Evolution, GT Legends, Grand Prix Legends and NASCAR Racing 2003 Season. In board gaming, Sebring was also featured in the first expansion for the Formula D board game by Asmodee games. People have also recreated this track using the course maker in Gran Turismo 6.

Notes

References

External links 

Map and circuit history at RacingCircuits.info 
A drivers description of the various track configurations
Trackpedia guide to Sebring
Audio walk-through of the track, for use with games

Motorsport venues in Florida
Formula One circuits
Panoz Auto Development
Buildings and structures in Sebring, Florida
American Le Mans Series circuits
IMSA GT Championship circuits
United States Grand Prix
Tourist attractions in Highlands County, Florida
1950 establishments in Florida
Sports venues completed in 1950
Road courses in the United States